Swaroopathil Nairs or Chernna Nairs were one of the subcastes belonging to the Nair community in Kerala. This subcaste is found only in Travancore. In Malabar, two related subcastes, Akathu Chernna Nairs and Purathu Chernna Nairs, are treated as being equivalent to Swaroopathil Nairs in caste hierarchy. They formed the bulk of the soldiers who were under the military command of the Kiryathil Nairs, the pinnacle of the Nair hierarchy.

Demographics
According to the 1891 Census, Swaroopathil Nairs composed around 9.2% of the total Nair population, while Akathu Charna and Purathu Charna Nairs accounted for 3.3% and 11.1% respectively.

See also
 Illathu Nair
 Demographics of Nair community

References 

Nair